The Peavey Destiny is a solid body electric guitar of the superstrat type, manufactured between 1989 and 1994 in the US by Peavey.

All models have neck-through construction, 24 frets, a  fingerboard radius, and a  scale.
The hardware included a Kahler Spyder double locking tremolo bridge  and Schaller strap locks.

The standard Destiny has a rock maple neck, a poplar body, solid color paint jobs, and black hardware.
The Destiny Custom has a flame maple neck, body wings of mahogany and gold-plated hardware.

The pickup and knob configuration, tremolo bridge, and overall body shape bears resemblance to the bolt-on HSS Fender HM Strat, and to the bolt-on Peavey Tracer (normally HS, but custom models did have HSS pickups).
Like the Tracer, the Destiny's headstock is an "un-reversed" version of the Peavey Vandenberg's reversed headstock.

Electronics
The pickup configuration is HSS.
The guitar has one master volume control (1MΩ pot) and one tone master control (250kΩ pot), in addition to a 5-way pickup selector switch and a coil tap toggle switch to split the humbucker, i.e. use it in a single-coil configuration.

References

See also
 List of Peavey guitars

Peavey electric guitars